NGC 7243 (also known as Caldwell 16) is an open cluster and Caldwell object in the constellation Lacerta. It shines at magnitude +6.4. Its celestial coordinates are RA , dec . It is located near the naked-eye stars Alpha Lacertae, 4 Lacertae, an A-class double star, and planetary nebula IC 5217. It lies approximately 2,800 light-years away, and is thought to be just over 100 million years old, consisting mainly of white and blue stars.

Notes

References

External links
 
 SEDS – NGC 7243
 
 VizieR – NGC 7243
 NED – NGC 7243
 

Open clusters
7243
016b
Lacerta (constellation)